Björneborg is a locality situated in Kristinehamn Municipality, Värmland County, Sweden with 1,099 inhabitants in 2010.

References

External links 
 

Populated places in Värmland County
Populated places in Kristinehamn Municipality